Physalaemus olfersii is a species of frog in the family Leptodactylidae. It is endemic to southeastern Brazil and is known from Espírito Santo, southeastern Minas Gerais, and São Paulo states. Records further south (southern São Paulo, Paraná, and Santa Catarina) refer to Physalaemus lateristriga, which was restored from the synonymy of Physalaemus olfersii in 2010. Common name Atlantic Forest dwarf frog has been proposed for this species.

Etymology
The specific name olfersii honors Ignaz von Olfers, German naturalist, historian, and diplomat.

Description
Adult males measure  and adult females  in snout–vent length. The body is moderately robust. The head is longer than it is wide. The snout is pointed to sub-elliptical in dorsal view and acute in lateral view. The tympanum is in distinct as is the supra-tympanic fold. The fingers and the toes are thin and long and have slightly expanded tips; no webbing is present. Dorsal coloration varies from light brown to gray with small, irregular, and scattered brown blotches. A median line is present on the posterior 2/3 of the dorsum. The loreal region is dark brown with some dispersed white dots. A black stripe runs from the postorbital region to the anterior margin of the  gland. A weak white line runs on the canthus rostralis, becoming well marked on the border of the upper eyelid and on the dorsolateral fold. The gular is dark gray with white dots that continue to the anterior part of the abdomen; the posterior of the abdomen is uniformly light brown. Males have a subgular vocal sac.

Habitat and conservation
Physalaemus olfersii occurs in primary and secondary forest at elevations below . It lives in the leaf litter, on the ground, and in low vegetation. Breeding takes place in temporary and permanent ponds. It is a common species, although it probably can be threatened by habitat loss.

References

olfersii
Amphibians of Brazil
Endemic fauna of Brazil
Amphibians described in 1856
Taxa named by Hinrich Lichtenstein
Taxa named by Eduard von Martens
Taxonomy articles created by Polbot